Fraile is Spanish for friar and may refer to:

People
 Alfonso Fraile, Spanish painter
 Francisco Fraile, Mexican politician
 Gorka Fraile, Spanish tennis player
 Hugo Fraile, Spanish footballer
 Luis Fraile, Spanish artist
 Omar Fraile, Spanish cyclist
 Susana Fraile, Spanish handball player

Places
 Fraile, Culebra, Puerto Rico, a barrio of the island-municipality of Culebra

See also
 Frailes (disambiguation)
 El Fraile (disambiguation)
 Frail (disambiguation)